Smartface is a mobile technology company focusing on enterprise mobility in the cloud for mobile transformation in enterprises. Smartface is headquartered in Palo Alto with offices in New Jersey, Istanbul and Dubai.

Smartface Cloud, a cloud-based native mobile application development and application lifecycle management platform for enterprises, is the latest generation of the products offered by Smartface Inc.

The previous generation product Smartface App Studio was a desktop based "Cross-platform Native Mobility Framework" for mobile application development.

In 2019, Smartface announced their focus on digital transformation with two new products, Appcircle.io for Continuous Integration and Continuous Delivery for mobile application development and Smartface Middleware Platform as a middleware specialized for frontend integration.

Appcircle.io Mobile CI/CD Platform 
Appcircle is a Continuous Integration and Continuous Delivery platform specific for mobile app development. As a CI/CD platform, it enables developers to automate their mobile app build, sign and deployment processes and it also provides in-browser mobile device emulator/simulators for iOS and Android. For automation and application lifecycle management, it uses a workflow-based system where developers can configure steps with a visual interface and add steps from a component marketplace.

It is an extension of the Smartface Cloud lifecycle management modules for universal use for any type of mobile app project as an independent product and for this reason, it has a separate presence at Appcircle.io. Similar to Smartface Cloud, it does not require the presence of a Mac to build, deploy and test iOS apps. One important difference from Smartface Cloud is that it is based on Kubernetes and supports private cloud and on-premise deployments besides software as a service use.

Smartface Middleware Platform 
Smartface Middleware Platform is a middleware specialized in frontend integration for modern frontends like mobile apps or chatbots. For this purpose, it can be categorized as "Backend for Frontend" (BFF) instead of a full-fledged middleware for communication between backend systems.

It includes features focusing on unifying cross-cutting concerns on a single platform to eliminate the repetition of work and to ensure frontend compatibility. It specifically focuses on rapid delivery and productivitization with its cloud-native architecture running on Kubernetes for scalability and availability.

Smartface Cloud 
Smartface Cloud is a Mobile Enterprise Application Platform (MEAP) with native iOS and Android app development and lifecycle management capabilities. It incorporates a cloud-based integrated development environment (Cloud IDE) that runs on the browser to develop native mobile apps with JavaScript. The apps developed in the cloud can be deployed directly on "on-device emulators" for iOS and Android, eliminating the dependency on a specific OS and hardware as well as physical connectivity for mobile application development (e.g. iOS apps can be developed without a Mac).

As for the lifecycle management, it incorporates integrated modules for testing, enterprise and app store distribution along with the ability to update native iOS and Android apps remotely. As a JavaScript based interpreter framework, Smartface allows updating application code and assets from a remote resource and run the updated app without the need for recompilation (e.g. critical updates can be done without waiting for the App Store review).

Smartface App Studio
Smartface App Studio is now deprecated and replaced with the Cloud IDE offered in Smartface Cloud. It is a cross-platform mobility framework (mobile application development platform) which offers its own integrated development environment to design, develop and publish native apps for Android and iOS.

Smartface App Studio offers a WYSIWYG design editor to design mobile apps and the design fits into Android and iOS devices without any additional effort. Coding is done with an integrated 100% JavaScript code editor. Native iOS and Android apps can be developed with a single JavaScript codebase.

Smartface App Studio is the only environment that allows whole native iOS development process to be done on Windows (as an alternative to Mac-only Xcode) with an on-device iPad/iPhone emulator for Windows PCs. The emulator also offers a full featured iOS debugger on Windows.

.apk output for Android and  output for iOS can be created with a single-click. Downloading Smartface App Studio and developing, publishing and submitting apps to app stores are free with the community license without any feature limitations. Also there are indie, professional, and enterprise license options available.

Partners and customers
Main partners and customers of Smartface:

Garanti Bank
Kofax
Vasco
Kobil
Kuveyt Turk
Akbank
Deniz Bank
BAB
VMG
Zain

See also 
Mobile application development
Mobinex
On Device Portal
Cross-platform

References

External links 
 
 https://www.smartface.io/guides
 https://cloud.smartface.io

Mobile software programming tools
Android (operating system) development software
IOS development software
Mobile software development
Integrated development environments
Mobile technology companies
Software companies based in the San Francisco Bay Area
Software companies of the United States